RRRR may refer to:
 the reporting mark for the Rock and Rail LLC
 Raritan River Railroad
 the morse code for surface raider, used in conjunction with SOS

See also
 RRR (disambiguation)
 RR (disambiguation)
 R (disambiguation)